Zone 80 is a zone in the municipality of Al-Shahaniya in the state of Qatar. The main district recorded in the 2015 population census was Al-Shahaniya City, the municipal seat. 

Other districts which fall within its administrative boundaries are Al Khurayb, Al Samriya, Lehsiniya, and Umm Leghab.

Demographics
As of the 2010 census, the zone comprised 3,440 housing units and 1,430 establishments. There were 35,393 people living in the zone, of which 81% were male and 19% were female. Out of the 35,393 inhabitants, 86% were 20 years of age or older and 14% were under the age of 20.

Employed persons made up 82% of the total population. Females accounted for 10% of the working population, while males accounted for 90% of the working population.

Land use
The Ministry of Municipality and Environment (MME) breaks down land use in the zone as follows.

References 

Zones of Qatar
Al-Shahaniya